Marcel Bloch may refer to:

 Marcel Dassault (Marcel Bloch, 1892–1986), French aircraft industrialist
 Marcel Bloch (aviator) (1890–1938), French World War I flying ace